The New Crystal Silence is a 2008 live jazz album by pianist Chick Corea and vibraphonist Gary Burton. It was released in a two-disc set. The first disc was recorded on May 10 and 12, 2007, at the Sydney Opera House Concert Hall. The second disc was recorded on July 7, 2007, at Bjornsonhuset in Molde, Norway, except for the track "Señor Mouse", which was recorded July 13, 2007, at the Auditorio de Tenerife in Canary Island, Spain.

Reception
The album peaked number 11 on the Billboard Top Jazz album charts and also won the Grammy awards for the Best Jazz Instrumental Album, Individual or Group.

Track listing

Disc one
"Duende" (Corea) – 10:54
"Love Castle" (Corea) – 12:41
"Brasilia" (Corea) – 9:38
"Crystal Silence" (Corea) – 14:09
"La Fiesta" (Corea) – 13:35

Disc two
"Bud Powell" (Corea) – 7:55
"Waltz for Debby" (Bill Evans) – 8:03
"Alegria" (Corea) – 5:49
"No Mystery" (Corea) – 9:12
"Señor Mouse" (Corea) – 9:10
"Sweet and Lovely" (Gus Arnheim, Charles Daniels, Harry Tobias) – 6:56
"I Love You Porgy" (George Gershwin, Ira Gershwin & DuBose Heyward) – 4:09
"La Fiesta" (Corea) – 10:41

Personnel
Chick Corea – piano
Gary Burton – vibraphone
Sydney Symphony Orchestra
Jonathan Stockhammer – conductor

Chart performance

See also 
 Crystal Silence (ECM, 1973)

References 

Gary Burton live albums
Chick Corea live albums
Collaborative albums
2008 live albums
Albums recorded at the Sydney Opera House
Grammy Award for Best Jazz Instrumental Album